Agreement for the Future – CenterLeft (Polish Porozumienie dla Przyszłości – CentroLewica) was a short-lived center-left electoral alliance of Social Democracy of Poland, Democratic Party and Greens 2004 founded by Dariusz Rosati on 1 February 2009 and dissolved 7 June 2009. 

2009 disestablishments in Poland
2009 establishments in Poland
Defunct political party alliances in Poland
Political parties disestablished in 2009
Political parties established in 2009